The International MBA program (abbreviated IMBA) at National Chengchi University College of Commerce was established in 2001 and was the first International MBA program in Taiwan. It is the first fully accredited English-taught MBA program in Taiwan. The program offers all course instruction in English with a specific focus on Asia-Pacific business dynamics, and cross-cultural understanding. Half of the students and faculty are local Taiwan citizens and the latter half are a diverse mixture of people from more than 35 countries on 5 continents.

Program Design 
The IMBA program offers full-time or part-time studies. This flexible design of courses allows candidates to decide their workload and schedule to accommodate their busy careers. Most classes are conducted in the evenings and weekends. The program also has ample courses and activities to keep full-time International MBA candidate well involved in their studies.
The program is slated for minimum 1 year of instruction, maximum 4 years to fulfill program requirements and requires a minimum of 42 credit hours for completion.

The program also offers the option of either pursuing a General MBA or a Specialized MBA in one of four concentrations namely, Entrepreneurship, Finance, Management in Asia and Marketing.

Required courses 
 Business Quantitative Methods
 Corporate Social Responsibility and Ethics 
 Financial Management
 International Business Management (3 credits) (for year 2016-entered and before) 
 Leaders Forum 
 Leadership and Team Building
 Accounting
 Managerial Economics
 Management Information Systems
 Marketing Management
 Strategic Management
 Strategic Talent Management (for year 2016-entered and before)

Elective courses 
Elective courses fall under four areas of concentration - Entrepreneurship, Finance, Management in Asia and Marketing. Students have an option to complete a number of the courses in the relevant area to obtain a Specialized MBA degree. Students can also take up courses under any area and graduate with a General MBA by fulfilling the credit requirements.
 Management in Asia
 Chinese Business in Global Perspective
 Confucianism and Leadership
 Cross Border Strategic Alliances
 Emerging Financial Markets
 Special Topics in Corporate Finance
 Small and Medium Size Enterprises
 Entrepreneurship
 Small and Medium Size Enterprises
 Entrepreneurship - Real World Read Cases
 Global Leadership
 Practical New Product Development and Marketing
 Venture Capital and Entrepreneurship
 Strategy and Business Modeling
 Finance
 Emerging Financial Markets
 Special Topics in Corporate Finance
 Fixed Income
 International Finance
 Special Topics on Profit Models
 Marketing
 Chinese Business in Global Perspective
 Cross Border Strategic: Alliances
 Practical New Product Development and Marketing
 Consumer Behavior
 Global and Cross Cultural Marketing
 Marketing Research

Faculty 
Instructors of the IMBA program are drawn from three equally qualified pools of local and international talent.  A third of the instructors hail from faculty members of the College of Commerce at National Chengchi University (NCCU), most of whom have earned Ph.Ds from prestigious universities around the world. Another third of the faculty are renowned scholars who are visiting instructors from top overseas business schools, and the final third of the faculty are industry senior executives who have long standing real-world business experiences.

International Exchange and Dual Degree Programs
To further assist students in facing challenges in international business environment, NCCU International MBA offers students exchange programs and dual degree programs with top leading universities in the Americas, Europe, Asia, and Pacific. School's international recognition by AACSB International (The Association to Advance Collegiate Schools of Business) and EQUIS (the European Quality Improvement System) has made it possible to establish reciprocal exchange programs with over 100 prestigious schools worldwide. Spending one term abroad at another institution allows students to further enrich studies by experiencing different cultural and business environments.

Continuing Education 
In addition to offering business courses within program, the IMBA offers an integrated system of continuing education with the facilities and resources of the college. The program allows for both current IMBA candidates and graduates to enroll in selected courses within program and throughout the College of Commerce on non-matriculating basis to broaden their studies. Also, the IMBA program encourages prospective candidates to audit courses.

See also 
 International Masters of Business Administration

External links
 NCCU IMBA official website 
 IMBA Dual Degree (in English)

2001 establishments in Taiwan
International MBA
Business qualifications
Master's degrees